Simaria is a village in India, along the Ganges river. It is in Begusarai District, Mithila region of India and near Barauni. Also called Kumbhsthali,Omritbhumi, Welcome Gate of Mithila Hindi poet Ramdhari Singh 'Dinkar' was born on 23 September 1908 in Simaria village, then part of Bengal Presidency, British India, now in Begusarai District, Mithila region of India. Situated on the South Eastern boundary of Begusarai, It is also famous for Simaria Mela, a fair of devotional importance during the month of Kartik every year according to Indian Panchang (usually during November). It has a famous bridge Simaria Pul which provides both Rail and Road connectivity to this place. People of Simaria widely speak Maithili language.

Simaria Mohakumbh
Recently Ordhkumbha a devotional congregation was held here in 2011 in an attempt to reestablish the lost importance of other 8 places where Kumbha was held according to scriptures. Not only "Ordhkumbha" but recently "Moha-Kumbha" was also held here in November, 2017.

Simaria Kalpwas
According to mythology, Shri Ram, Lakshman and Vishwamitra had spent a whole month during the Kartik month on the Simaria coast. Even then, devotees make a cottage every year on the banks of Simaria, which is called Kalpwas and dives in the river. , Because it is believed that during this period a dip in the Ganges dashes all the sins. During the period the environment becomes very religious, and the celebration ends with the Chhath festival. The sacredness of the Ganges is indisputable, from which it passes any time, but some holy places around it have earned a more sacred identity. Simaria is one of them. Kartika - Fair has been recognized as State Fair. On the banks of River Ganga, Kalpvas has also been appreciated in "Fishy Mahapuraan" (Chapter 108). All pilgrims from Mithilanchal, West Bengal, Orissa, Eastern Uttar Pradesh and even down of Nepal come here on the banks of the Ganges for Kalpvas for a month. It seems that in the poems of Vidyapati, the border of Ganga can be Simaria. The continuous flow of devotees from Mithila's heart to Simaria supports this belief.
It is believed that since the time of Raja Videh, the tradition of Kalpavas festival is on the banks of the Simaria Ganga river. The boundary of Amethila is Simaria. Ganga is still the center of religious faith for the Mithila residents. Even today, Simaria is the legend of Mithila and the salvation of Mantra. Raja Janak (Videh) had made his last rites in his last state and sacrificed his life here.

References 

Cities and towns in Begusarai district